Alasmidonta wrightiana, the Ochlockonee arcmussel, was a species of freshwater mussel, an aquatic bivalve mollusk in the family Unionidae, the river mussels.

This species was endemic to the Ochlockonee River in Florida and Georgia. This river mussel is now extinct.

References

Extinct bivalves
wrightiana
Bivalves described in 1901
Taxa named by Edmund Murton Walker
Taxonomy articles created by Polbot